Jada Toys, Inc. is an American manufacturer of collectible scale model cars, figures, radio controlled model vehicles, and dolls. It was founded in 1999 by Jack and May Li. Jada's products are predominantly aimed at the collectible market, and are available and popular at retail outlets worldwide.

The company has or has had license rights to market products from a wide range of entertainment companies and franchises as well as sports associations, including DC Comics, Disney, Marvel Comics, NASCAR, NBA, WWE, Fast & Furious, and Hello Kitty, among others.

History
Founded by Jack and May Li in 1999, Jada's first toy was a 1:24 scale die-cast 1953 Chevrolet tow truck, part of their Thunder Crusher line. Though the Chevrolet tow truck toy and other lines proved successful, the company remained in obscurity until the introduction of the urban-themed DUB City brand. Launched in collaboration with DUB Magazine in 2002, the line presents officially licensed vehicles with custom rims, lowered ride height and special in-car entertainment systems.  Dubs, so named for their 20-inch or bigger wheels, are among the company's best sellers and the most visible in retail outlets.

The company launched the DUB City spinoff Chub City in 2005. Targeted at a younger generation of collectors, the line included heavily stylized vehicles and a story told through webisodes and comics. The human characters featured in the story inspired toys of their own. By 2007, the line had done over $12.5 million in sales and was featured in a Burger King kids meal promotion. In 2009, Jada sold the brand to Dentsu Entertainment; who, in conjunction with Fuel Entertainment and Nelvana, planned on launching a $15 million 52-episode animated series in late 2015. At the time of the sale, Chub City toys had sold over 20 million units.

Branching out of automotive licensing, in 2008 Jada Toys teamed up with Activision to release the Guitar Hero Air Guitar Rocker. The toy consists of a belt buckle, a portable speaker and two guitar picks. Waving the pick near the buckle lets the user play air guitar to one of ten songs (five licensed tracks) such as Black Sabbath's "Iron Man" and Boston's "More Than A Feeling." Two cartridges that add additional songs were also released.

In 2011, Jada entered the girls category when it received a license to produce Hello Kitty play sets and remote-controlled cars. This was followed up with the company's own line of fashion dolls called Cutie Pops in 2012 and the RC line GirlMazing in 2014.

Jada became the master toy licensee for the RoboCop reboot in 2013. In 2014, the company gained the rights to produce vehicular toys based on Jurassic World and the Fast and Furious series.

2016 saw the introduction of the Metals Die Cast line of figures. Based on various licensed entertainment properties, Jada offers the line in 2", 4" and 6" scales. The company planned to release over 150 Metal Die Cast products in its first year.

On January 29, 2019, the company was acquired by Simba Dickie Group.

Products

Own products 

 10th Anniversary
 Badge City Heat
 Battle Machines 
 Big Time 4Wheelin
 Big Time Muscle 
 Big Time Kustoms
 Buddy The Dog
 Chub City
 Collector's Club
 Cutie Pops
 D-Rod$ 
 Donk, Box & Bubble 
 DUB City
 DUB City: Euro Spec
 For $ale 
 Garage Worx
 GirlMazing: Radio Control
 Hero Patrol: Precincts 
 High Profile 
 Homie Rollerz
 Hot Rigz
 Hyper Chargers RC
 Import Racer! 
 Just Trucks
 Kustom Kings 
 LOPRO
 Metals Die Cast 
 Metal Formz
 Nexgen Muscle
 NYPD
 Option D! 
 Road Rats
 Road Rigz 
 Showroom Floor 
 Snap & Build
 Street Low 
 Snap Shots 
 Thunder Crusher
 VDub$ 

Notes

Licensed
In addition to Jada's own lines, the company also produces a wide range of branded toys and diecast products based on various movies, TV Shows, sports leagues, comics, games, and characters.

 '06 Camaro Concept 
 Assassin's Creed
 Batman v Superman: Dawn of Justice
 Captain America: Civil War
 Chop Socky Chooks
 DC Comics
 Deadpool
 Disney
 Disney Parks
 Doctor Strange
 Donkey Hodie 
 Fast & Furious
 Finding Dory
 Ghostbusters
 Guardians of the Galaxy
 Guitar Hero
 Halo
 Hello Kitty
 Initial D
 Iron Man
 Iron Man 2
 Jake and the Never Land Pirates
 Jurassic World
 Marvel Universe
 Marvel Super Hero Squad
 Mickey Mouse Clubhouse
 Minnie Mouse Mow-Tique
 Miles from Tomorrowland
 Minecraft
 Mortal Kombat
 NASCAR
 National Basketball Association
 Power Rangers
 Realtree
 Reservoir Dogs
 RoboCop
 Scarface
 Sofia the First
 Speed Racer
 Spider-Man
 Star Trek
 Street Fighter
 Suicide Squad
 Teenage Mutant Ninja Turtles
 The Avengers
 The Avengers: Age of Ultron
 The Godfather
 The Little Mermaid
 The Walking Dead
 The Sopranos
 Von Dutch
 Wonder Woman
 World Wrestling Entertainment
 X-Men

Notes

References

External links

Jada Club 
Metals Die Cast

Companies based in the City of Industry, California
Model manufacturers of the United States
Toy companies established in 1999
Toy cars and trucks
Die-cast toys
Radio-controlled car manufacturers
1999 establishments in California